Natrix is a genus of Old World snakes found across Eurasia (although the range of Natrix tessellata extends into Egypt and those of N. astreptophora and N. maura into north-west Africa) in the subfamily Natricinae of the family Colubridae.

Common names
Member species of the genus Natrix are collectively called grass snakes and water snakes, but some other snake species also known commonly as "grass snakes" and "water snakes" are not in the genus.

Species
The genus Natrix contains five extant species and at least five extinct (fossil-only) species.

Nota bene: A binomial authority in parentheses indicates that the species was originally described in a genus other than Natrix.

Etymology
Natrix is classical Latin for a water snake. The word comes from a Proto-Indo-European root meaning "snake", with cognates in the Celtic and Germanic languages, the latter including the English adder. It was probably influenced through folk etymology by the Latin nare and natare meaning "swim"; it appears to be a grammatically feminine word for "swimmer".

Geography
The refuge of a widely distributed Western European lineage regarding the barred grass snake commonly known as Natrix helvetica was most likely located in southern France and outside the classical refuges in the southern European peninsulas. One genetic lineage of the common grass snake (N. natrix) is also distributed in Scandinavia, Central Europe, and the Balkan Peninsula.

References

Further reading
Laurenti JN (1768). Specimen medicum, exhibens synopsin reptilium emendatam cum experimentis circa venena et antidota reptilium austriacorum. Vienna: "Joan. Thom. Nob. de Trattnern". 214 pp. + Plates I-V. (Natrix, new genus, p. 73). (in Latin).

 
Snake genera
Taxa named by Josephus Nicolaus Laurenti